Musefu is a town located in Kasai-Central. A  southern-central province of Democratic Republic of the Congo.

External links
 Musefu's Town on the website nona.net

Populated places in Kasaï-Central